Eucalyptus carnei, also known as the Carne's blackbutt, is a species of tree or mallee that is endemic to an area in central Western Australia. It has smooth grey bark, lance-shaped adult leaves, flower buds in groups of seven, creamy white flowers, and cup-shaped to conical fruit.

Description
The flowers are creamy white and appear between February and May.

Taxonomy
Eucalyptus carnea was first formally described by the botanist Charles Austin Gardner in 1929 and the description was published in the Journal of the Royal Society of Western Australia. Gardner found the type specimen near Sandstone in 1927. The specific epithet honours Walter Mervyn Carne, a plant pathologist who was supervisor of fresh fruit and vegetable exports for the Victorian Department of Commerce and Agriculture from 1941 to 1950, and the first botanist to be elected to the position of president of the Royal Society of Western Australia.

This species is also a part of the Eucalyptus subgenus Symphyomyrtus section Bisectae subsection Glandulosae because the cotyledons are bisected, the buds have a scar on the operculum and the branchlets have oil glands in the pith. Eucalyptus carnei is closely related to only one other species, E. stricklandii, and the two form the series Stricklandianae.

Distribution
Carne's blackbutt is found in stony skeletal soils, red sand and on rocky laterite. It is distributed through the Goldfields and Mid West regions of Western Australia from east of Meekatharra and Sandstone into the Great Victoria Desert.

See also
List of Eucalyptus species

References

Eucalypts of Western Australia
Trees of Australia
carnei
Myrtales of Australia
Plants described in 1929
Taxa named by Charles Gardner